"Without You" is a song recorded by South Korean boy group NCT U, the first unit of NCT. It was released on April 10, 2016 by SM Entertainment. Musically, "Without You" was described as an EDM rock genre song with intense electric guitar sounds.

Background and release 
At midnight of August 10, "Without You" sung by NCT U's Taeil, Jaehyun, and Doyoung was released through various sites. The single includes a Chinese version of the song as a bonus track which additionally features vocals from then-SMROOKIES member Kun.

Composition 
The lyrics of this song tell us about the happiness of understanding each other and living together in an era of intense competition.

Music video 
SM Rookies (now-NCT member) Winwin appeared.

Track listing

Charts

References 

2016 songs
NCT (band) songs
SM Entertainment singles